"Jangan Kau Bohong" is a song performed by singer Fatin Shidqia featuring New Kingz. It is her third single  and featured on her debut album titled For You was released on 19 February 2014.

Music videos

The lyric video was released on February 7, 2014 on SMEI's YouTube account channel

Track listing
Digital download
 Jangan Kau Bohong (feat. New Kingz) - 4:01

Charts

Weekly Charts

References

2014 singles
2014 songs
Sony Music singles